Earl Grey tea is a tea blend which has been flavoured with oil of bergamot. The rind's fragrant oil is added to black tea to give Earl Grey its unique taste. Traditionally, Earl Grey was made from black teas such as Chinese keemun, and therefore intended to be served without milk.  However, tea companies have since begun to offer Earl Grey made from stronger teas such as Ceylons, which are better suited to the addition of milk or cream. Some blend the tea with lapsang souchong tea which lends a smoky character. Other varieties have been introduced as well, such as green or oolong.

History

The earliest reference to tea flavoured with bergamot dates to 1824; however the article in question makes no mention of Earl Grey. The use of bergamot seems to have been used to enhance the taste of low-quality teas. This practice seems to have been disreputable, as in 1837 charges were laid against a company accused of adding bergamot to misrepresent their tea as a superior product (at a higher price).

Charles Grey, second Earl Grey 

It has been suggested that the Earl Grey blend, or "Earl Grey's Mixture", may have been named after Charles Grey, 2nd Earl Grey, British Prime Minister in the 1830s. However, the fact that adding bergamot to teas was viewed as disreputable near the time of his death suggests that, while it is possible that the second Earl Grey encountered tea flavoured with bergamot, it seems rather unlikely that he would have championed it. Nonetheless, there have been a number of theories attempting to link the tea to the earl.

One legend claims that a grateful Chinese mandarin whose son was rescued from drowning by one of Lord Grey's men first presented the blend to the Earl in 1803. The tale appears to be apocryphal, as Lord Grey never set foot in China and the use of bergamot oil to scent tea was then unknown in China. However, this tale is subsequently told (and slightly corrected) on the Twinings website, as "having been presented by an envoy on his return from China".

Another legend claims that he received as a gift, probably a diplomatic perquisite, tea flavoured with bergamot oil, perhaps as a result of his ending the monopoly held by the East India Company on trade between Britain and China.

According to the Grey family, the tea was specially blended by a Chinese mandarin for Lord Grey, to suit the water at Howick Hall, the family seat in Northumberland, using bergamot in particular to offset the preponderance of lime in the local water. Lady Grey used it to entertain in London as a political hostess, and it proved so popular that she was asked if it could be sold to others, which is how Twinings came to market it as a brand.

Jacksons of Piccadilly claim they originated Earl Grey's Tea, Lord Grey having given the recipe to George Charlton, partner at Robert Jackson & Co., in 1830. According to Jacksons, the original recipe has been in constant production and has never left their hands. Theirs has been based on Chinese black tea since the beginning.

Alternative theories 

Other theories for the provenance of the tea suggest it may have been developed independently of the 2nd Earl of Grey, with the Earl title being added at a later date.

References have been found in old advertisements dating to the 1850s and 1860s (after the death of the second Earl of Grey) to "Grey's Tea" or "Grey's mixture", with the earliest being attributed to a tea merchant known as William Grey in 1852. The first known published references to an "Earl Grey" tea are advertisements by Charlton & Co. of Jermyn Street in London in the 1880s. It has been suggested that the "Earl" title was added to make the tea seem more posh, or alternately that it became associated with Henry Grey, 3rd Earl Grey, who was alive at the time where the "Earl" title began to be attributed to the tea.

Modern Impressions 

A 2010 survey found that a significant number of people in the United Kingdom associate drinking Earl Grey tea with being "posh" or "middle class".

Preparation and variations

"Earl Grey" as applied to tea is not a registered trademark, and numerous tea companies produce their own versions of Earl Grey tea, using a wide variety of tea leaves and additives.

Bergamot orange (Citrus bergamia) is a small citrus tree which blossoms during the winter and is grown commercially in Calabria, Italy. It is probably a hybrid of Citrus limetta (sweet lime) and Citrus aurantium (bitter orange).

Like other black teas, Earl Grey tea leaves undergo an oxidation process. The oxidation of the leaves results in a change of the chemical composition of the leaves and a stronger flavour. Occasionally, green tea leaves or oolong leaves are used in place of the black tea leaves. When this is the case, the oxidation process is skipped and the tea becomes Earl Green tea. There are two methods of flavouring the black tea leaves to get Earl Grey tea. The first, which is said to result in a stronger citrus flavour, is the coating or spraying of the black tea leaves with bergamot essential oils. The second method is the addition of dried bergamot orange rinds to the Earl Grey tea blend. With this method, the citrus flavour infuses the black tea leaves during the brewing process.

The brewing process varies significantly, depending on personal preference. Opinions vary on the preferred method of boiling the water, as well as the ideal steeping time. Steeping for too long results in a bitter flavour; two to three minutes is a common recommendation, although some recommend as long as five minutes in order to "enjoy the full benefit of the citrus aroma."
There are different varieties of a tea known as Lady Grey; the two most common kinds are cornflower Lady Grey and citrus Lady Grey, which combine Earl Grey tea with cornflower and Seville oranges, respectively. "Lady Grey" is a trademark of Twinings.
A beverage called "London fog" is a combination of Earl Grey, steamed milk and vanilla syrup.
There are variations available including such ingredients as jasmine, as well as various flowers. A blend with added rose petals is known as French Earl Grey, which has become the most popular blend at Australian tea store T2.
A variety called Russian Earl Grey often contains ingredients such as citrus peels and lemon grass in addition to the usual black tea and bergamot.
A variety called Earl Grey Crème contains ingredients or flavours such as black tea, lavender, bergamot, and vanilla.
Several companies make a tea called Earl Grey Green or "Earl Green" tea, replacing black tea with green tea leaves. A similar variation called Earl Grey White or "Earl White" tea combines white tea leaves with bergamot flavouring.
Rooibos Earl Grey is a variation using this South African herbal tea as a substitute for black tea.

Use as a flavouring

Earl Grey tea is used as a flavouring for many types of cakes and confectionery, such as chocolates, as well as savoury sauces. For sauces, the flavour is normally created by adding tea bags to the basic stock, boiling for a few minutes and then discarding the bags. For sweet recipes, loose tea is often added to melted butter or hot cream and strained after the flavour is
infused.

Health benefits and risks 

Like other black teas, the polyphenols and caffeine in Earl Grey tea are reputed to have cardiovascular, digestive, and cancer-preventitive benefits, but research in these areas remains inconclusive.

The bergamot oil used to flavour Earl Grey tea may provide health benefits as well as risks to its consumers. Some studies have suggested that the oil may be able to lower cholesterol and have some analgesic properties.

On the other hand, bergamot has health risks. These risks can include an array of skin issues.

Consuming too much of bergamot teas can lead to issues with potassium intake. Lowered potassium in the body can lead to experiencing cramping and muscle twitching. 
In one case study, a patient who consumed four litres of Earl Grey tea per day reported muscle cramps, which were attributed to the function of the bergapten in bergamot oil as a potassium channel blocker. The symptoms subsided upon reducing his consumption of Earl Grey tea to one litre per day.

Bergamot is a source of bergamottin which, along with the chemically related compound 6',7'-dihydroxybergamottin, is known to be responsible for grapefruit–drug interactions in which the consumption of the juice affects the metabolism of a variety of pharmaceutical drugs.

In several studies, application of high concentrations of some brands of bergamot oil directly to the skin was shown to increase redness after exposure to ultraviolet light; however, this should not apply to ordinary oral consumption of Earl Grey tea.

References

External links
 

 

Blended tea
English drinks
Tea in the United Kingdom